The 1974 Women's College World Series (WCWS) was contested among 18 college softball teams on May 16–19 in Omaha, Nebraska. This was the sixth WCWS.

Teams
The double elimination tournament included these teams:

 Arizona
 Eastern Illinois
 Golden West College (CA)
 Indiana State
 Kansas
 Luther College (IA)
 UMass
 Michigan State
 Nassau Community College (NY)
 North Dakota State
 Northern Colorado
 South Carolina
 South Dakota State
 Southwest Missouri State
 Wayne State (NE)
 Weber State
 West Georgia
 Winona State (MN)

Southwest Missouri State won all five of its games to win the national championship, defeating Northern Colorado in the final, 14-7.

Bracket

Source:

Ranking

See also

References

Women's College World Series
Soft
Women's College World Series
Women's College World Series
Women's College World Series
Women's sports in Nebraska